The Munich S-Bahn Stammstrecke is an 11 km long part of the Munich S-Bahn, running from Munich Pasing station to Munich East station, partly running in a double-track rail tunnel connecting München Hauptbahnhof with Munich East station.

Background
An underground railway line for Munich was first proposed in 1928 in a report on the "relocation of traffic centres". An underground route would allow "direct long distance traffic to and through the city centre".

On 22 May 1938, the first tunnel, which was part of the north–south route, was started in the Lindwurmstraße, between the present-day underground stations Sendlinger Tor and Goetheplatz. In the speech of Julius Dorpmüller, the general director of Deutsche Reichsbahn, the project was called "S-Bahn" for the first time. Due to World War II the construction and plans for the Munich S-Bahn were set aside.

In 1965, the Federal Republic of Germany, the Free State of Bavaria, the state capital of Munich and the Deutsche Bundesbahn signed a contract on the construction of the Munich S-Bahn. The further development was most influenced by a decision made in Rome on 26 April 1966: the International Olympic Committee chose Munich over Detroit, Madrid and Montreal as the location for the 1972 Summer Olympics, resulting in a tight schedule of only six years to complete the Munich S-Bahn network.

On 25 February 1971 the topping-out ceremony could be celebrated in the core route tunnel. In May the first S-Bahn train of the ET 420 series was put into service on the route between Pasing and Gauting. On 1 September 1971 a regular advance service was started on that route.

Opening
Town names in the nearby Munich such as Dachau, Tutzing, Erding and Pasing came into the picture. It was the first time a S-Bahn network that size was put into service on a single date. The route S10 to Wolfratshausen (today S7) was operated with conventional push-pull trains from the southern wing of Munich Central Station. It was electrified later and connected to the core route after the construction of a  tunnel crossing the large number of mainline rail tracks leading to Munich Central Station.

Three months later the German President Gustav Heinemann opened the 1972 Summer Olympics. During the Games there were two additional S-Bahn lines servicing the now-defunct station Olympiastadion (Olympic Stadium). The new S-Bahn system stood the test and transported 3.18 million passengers in 7,138 runs to and from the sports sites in only 17 days.

Future
Due to the overloading of the Stammstrecke, Trunk line 2 is under construction and due to open in 2026.

References

Munich S-Bahn
Munich S-Bahn lines
Railway lines in Bavaria
Standard gauge railways in Germany
Buildings and structures in Munich
Underground commuter rail